The Falkland Islands Government Office in London is the representative office of the British Overseas Territory of the Falkland Islands in the United Kingdom, also referred to as Falkland House. It was opened in 1983, one year after the Falklands War.

References

External links
Official site

Falkland Islands
Buildings and structures in the City of Westminster
Falkland Islands
British Overseas Territories–United Kingdom relations